Back end, back-end or backend may refer to:

Electronics

Computing
 Back end (computing), the data access layer in software architecture
 Back-end CASE
 Back-end database, a database accessed indirectly through an external application
 Back-end processor, hardware that stores and retrieves data from a database

Integrated circuits
 Back-end design, in electronic circuit design flow
 Back end of line, in integrated circuit fabrication

Other uses
 Archaic northern English dialect word for autumn 
 Back end load, a mutual fund fee
 "Backend" (song), a song on DaBaby's album Baby on Baby
 Slang for buttocks, an anatomical feature

See also
 
 
 Back (disambiguation)
 End (disambiguation)
 Front end (disambiguation)